The Department of Environment and Regional Policy (}) is the department of the Basque Government responsible for the community's environment, urban planning and all forms of transport.

Ministers 
 
 1936-1979: Gonzalo Nardiz
 
 1978-1980: Juan Ajuriagerra (regional planning and environment) and Mikel Isasi (fisheries)
 
 1980-1984: Felix Ormazabal (agriculture) and Xabier Lasagabazter (regional planning, fisheries)
 1984-1985: Felix Ormazabal (agriculture and fishing) and Castor Garate (regional planning)
 1985-1987: Felix Ormazabal (agriculture and fishing) and Jose Ramon Estonba (regional planning)
 1987-1991: Felix Ormazabal (agriculture and fishing) and Jose Miguel Martin (environment)
 1991-1995: Jose Manuel Goikoetxea (agriculture and fishing) and Jon Larrinaga (environment)
 1995-1998: Javier Retegi (agriculture and fishing) and Francisco Jose Ormazabal (regional planning and environment)
 1998-2001: Iñaki Gerenabarrena (agriculture and fishing) and Francisco Jose Ormazabal (regional planning and environment)
 2001-2005: Gonzalo Saenz de Samaniego (agriculture and fishing) and Sabin Intxaurraga (regional planning and environment)
 2005-2009: Gonzalo Saenz de Samaniego (agriculture, fishing and Elikadura) and Esther Larrañaga (regional planning and environment)
 2009-2012: Pilar Unzalu (environment, regional planning, agriculture and fishing)
 2012-present: Ana Oregi (environment and Lurralde Politika)

External links 
  
  

Basque Government